Tonestus peirsonii (syn. Lorandersonia peirsonii) is a local-endemic species of flowering plant in the aster family known by the common names Inyo tonestus, Peirson's serpentweed and Peirson's tonestus.

Distribution
The plant is endemic to California, where it is known only from the Eastern High Sierra Nevada, and the White Mountains across Owens Valley to the east, both within Inyo National Forest. It grows in mountain habitat in subalpine and alpine climates at 2900–3700 m, preferring rock talus or niches in granite cliffs. These images are from the original type location high in Rock Creek basin, Inyo County CA.

Description
Tonestus peirsonii is a perennial herb producing a branching stem from a caudex and taproot unit, reaching up to about 20 centimeters tall and taking a clumpy form. The leaves are up to 8 centimeters long, variable in shape but usually broader toward the end, and with toothed edges. Dried remnants of leaves or flowers from previous years may be visible.

The inflorescence is usually a single flower head, or a cluster of up to four heads, each up to 2 centimeters wide with green, rough-haired phyllaries in a broad (14-28mm) somewhat leaf-like involucre below the flower. The head bears 16-20 curling, bright yellow ray florets around a center containing many tubular disc florets. Blooming occurs in July and August.

See also

References

External links
Jepson Manual Treatment of Tonestus peirsonii
Tonestus peirsonii Photo gallery

Astereae
Endemic flora of California
Flora of the Sierra Nevada (United States)
•
Natural history of Inyo County, California
Flora without expected TNC conservation status